The enzyme caldesmon-phosphatase (EC 3.1.3.55) catalyzes the reaction

caldesmon phosphate + H2O  caldesmon + phosphate

This enzyme belongs to the family of hydrolases, specifically those acting on phosphoric monoester bonds.  The systematic name is caldesmon-phosphate phosphohydrolase. Other names in common use include SMP-I, and smooth muscle caldesmon phosphatase.

References

 

EC 3.1.3
Enzymes of unknown structure